The 53rd edition of the Vuelta a España was held 5  to 27 September 1998 and began in Córdoba and ended in Madrid.
Spaniard Abraham Olano took the leader's jersey after the first individual time trial with 41 seconds over Frenchman Laurent Jalabert. Olano's lead in the mountains decreased each stage as teammate José María Jiménez marked Olano's rivals and took several stage wins in the process until Jiménez took the jersey from Olano on the final mountain stage to Alto de Navacerrada with Olano in third place at 38 seconds. On the following day's individual time trial, Olano took back the lead to win the only Grand Tour of his career.

The race also saw the astonishing comeback of Lance Armstrong after he was diagnosed with advanced testicular cancer in 1996. Armstrong's fourth-place finish was stripped by USADA in 2012 due to doping.

Teams 

A total of 22 teams were invited to participate in the 1998 Vuelta a España. Seventeen of the competing squads were Trade Team I teams, four teams were Trade Team II teams, while the other team was Trade Team III. Each team sent a squad of nine riders, so the Vuelta began with a peloton of 198 cyclists, a total of 108 riders made it to the finish in Madrid.

The 22 teams invited to the race were:

Stages

Classification leadership

Final standings

General classification

Points classification

Mountains classification

Sprints classification

Team classification

References

 
1998
1998 in road cycling
1998 in Spanish sport
September 1998 sports events in Europe